Necydalosaurus is a genus of beetles in the family Cerambycidae, containing the following species:

 Necydalosaurus durantoni Touroult & Tavakilian, 2008
 Necydalosaurus ichneumonides Touroult & Tavakilian, 2008
 Necydalosaurus mysticus Tippmann, 1960

References

Xystrocerini